The following is a list of Air Force bases in Mexico:

Campo Militar No. 1, Mexico City
Base Aérea Militar No. 1, Santa Lucía, Estado de Mexico
Base Aérea Militar No. 2, Ixtepec, Oaxaca
Base Aérea Militar No. 3, Ciprés, Baja California
Base Aérea Militar No. 4, Cozumel, Quintana Roo
Base Aérea Militar No. 5, Zapopan, Jalisco
Base Aérea Militar No. 6, Tuxtla Gutiérrez, Chiapas
Base Aérea Militar No. 7, Pie de la Cuesta, Guerrero
Base Aérea Militar No. 8, Mérida, Yucatán
Base Aérea Militar No. 9, La Paz, Baja California Sur
Base Aérea Militar No. 10, Culiacán, Sinaloa
Base Aérea Militar No. 11, Santa Gertrudis, Chihuahua
Base Aérea Militar No. 12, Tijuana, Baja California
Base Aérea Militar No. 13, Chihuahua, Chihuahua
Base Aérea Militar No. 14, Apodaca, Nuevo León
Base Aérea Militar No. 15, Sn. Juan Bautista la Raya, Oaxaca
Base Aérea Militar No. 16, Cd. Pemex, Tabasco
Base Aérea Militar No. 17, Copalar, Chiapas
Base Aérea Militar No. 18, Hermosillo, Sonora

Bases
Military installations of Mexico